This is a comprehensive list of songs by Pakistani sufi rock band Junoon. The band have released seven studio albums, as well as numerous live albums, compilations, singles, and video albums. This list does not contain live versions or remixes.

Original songs

Other songs

Cover versions

External links
Junoon.com - Official Website
Junoon discography at Official Website

Junoon discography at Billboard

Junoon